Route 405, also known as Highlands Road, is a  minor highway in the western region of Newfoundland in the Canadian province of Newfoundland and Labrador.  The highway begins at a junction with Route 1 (Trans-Canada Highway) and continues to its west terminus, the community of Highlands.

Route description

Route 405 begins at an intersection with Route 1 directly across the Crabbes River from Crabbes River Park. The highway heads northwestward through rural areas, paralleling the Crabbes River, to pass through St. Fintan's, where it makes a sharp left at an intersection with a local road leading to St. David's and Maidstone. Route 405 now heads southwest to cross the Highlands River and pass through Loch Leven to turn north and parallel the Highlands River for several kilometres. The highway makes another sharp left as it begins following the coastline and passes through Highlands. Provincial maintenance for Route 405 ends at the southern tip of the community, with the road continuing southward for several kilometres as a gravel road.

Major intersections

References

405